This is a list of Chinese and Chinese-influenced dishes in Sino-Mauritian cuisine:

Main dishes

Poultry and eggs

Rice

Noodles

Dumplings

Buns and bread

Side dishes

Preserved vegetables

Soups and broths

Pastries, desserts, snacks and appetizers

Appetizers

Savoury snacks

Pastries, desserts, and sweet snacks

Traditional Chinese sweets

Beverages

Sauce and condiments

See also 

 Mauritians of Chinese origin
 Mauritian cuisine
 Culture of Mauritius

References 

Dishes
Mauritian culture